The Compañía Cervecera de Puerto Rico (formerly known as Cervecería India) is a large brewery in Puerto Rico. It is located in Mayagüez, Puerto Rico. The company's main brand is Medalla Light.

History
The company was founded on November 2, 1937 by the brothers Valdés Cobián: Alfonso, Sabino and Ramón Valdés Cobián, in Mayagüez, the largest city on the west coast of Puerto Rico. The Valdés brothers were following the example of their father, Don Ramon Valdés, who had founded the Mayagüez Light, Power and Ice Company in 1910. In 1938, their first beer, Cerveza India, was released to the public. The company competed with two other native beer breweries, "Real" and "Cerveceria Corona" (Cerveceria Corona de Puerto Rico "subsequently sold its trademark rights to Cervecería Modelo de México, which then launched Cerveza Corona as Modelo's Corona Extra)." Alfonso, as chairman and president, successfully led his company converting it into Puerto Rico's largest beer brewery and manufacturer of canned and bottled soft drinks.

In the late 70s, the brewery was forced to expand its portfolio and produce a lighter beer with less calories than their Cerveza India. Until that time, India was the only alcoholic beverage producing plant in Mayagüez.

In 1985, their main competition, Corona, went bankrupt and left a free way to Cervecería India, which was in full swing after the release of its new product Medalla Light years before. In October 2009, the brewery reverted its name to "Compañía Cervecera de Puerto Rico".

From 2002 to 2017, Camalia Valdés served as president and CEO of the company.  In 2017, Grace Marie Valdés succeeded Camalia as president and CEO.

The company works to promote the art and culture of Puerto Rico.

Products
The company's main product is Medalla Light, a 4.2% abv pale lager. The brewery also produces Malta India, a non-alcoholic soft drink made from barley. In 1940, it began producing Orange Crush and Old Colony sodas. In May 2010, the brewery announced the launch of their new beer, Silver Key Light, which hit the market on June 1, 2010. They launched Magna, a premium beer, on August 1, 2011. On November 5, 2019 Cerveza India who was their first beer was relaunch as a limited edition.

Gallery

References

External links

 
 Official site Compañía Cervecera of Puerto Rico
 Medallalight.com
 Mayagüezsabeamango.com

Beer in the Caribbean
Mayagüez, Puerto Rico
Privately held companies of Puerto Rico
Beer in Puerto Rico
Food and drink companies of Puerto Rico
1937 establishments in Puerto Rico